Wayne Baker Brooks (born April 30, 1970, in Chicago, Illinois) is an American blues and blues-rock guitarist and singer.

Biography
The son of the Chicago blues musician Lonnie Brooks, he joined his father's band playing guitar in the band in 1990. In 1997, he formed the Wayne Baker Brooks Band. In 1998 he spearheaded and co-authored the book Blues for Dummies with Cub Koda and Lonnie Brooks, published in August that year. On October 27, 1998, he and his band performed for then–First Lady Hillary Clinton at Willie Dixon's Blues Heaven Foundation/Chess Records, in Chicago.

On July 15, 2003, Brooks performed at U.S. Cellular Field in front of 47,000 people at the Major League Baseball All Star Game.

Brooks started his own record label in 2003 and released his debut album, Mystery on October 26, 2004, receiving numerous accolades, including four stars from Allmusic.

Discography

Awards
Real Blues Magazine Awards 
 Best Blues Book (Blues for Dummies), 1998
 Carry-the-Blues-Torch Award, 2004
 Top Blues-Stars-of-the-Future Award, 2004

References

External links
 Official website
 [ Allmusic Biography]
 [ AllMusic.com Review of Mystery]

1970 births
Living people
American blues guitarists
American male guitarists
American blues singers
Singers from Chicago
Chicago blues musicians
Electric blues musicians
Blues rock musicians
Songwriters from Illinois
Writers from Chicago
Blues musicians from Illinois
Guitarists from Chicago
21st-century American guitarists
21st-century American male singers
21st-century American singers
Alligator Records artists
American male songwriters